Lovie Simone Oppong (born November 29, 1998) is an American actress, best known for her role as Zora Greenleaf in the Oprah Winfrey Network drama series, Greenleaf.

Life and career
Simone was born in New York City at The Bronx and raised in Orange County, New York. Here, she attended Monroe-Woodbury High School from her freshman year to senior year. Her mother is African American and her father is Ghanaian. She has a twin sister named Yuri, who's a musician that goes by Reiyo The Giant and a younger brother and sister. She studied at an acting school in New York and later appeared in a national commercial for JC Penney.

In 2016, Simone began starring in the Oprah Winfrey Network drama series, Greenleaf playing the role of Zora Greenleaf, the daughter of Kerissa (Kim Hawthorne) and Jacob Greenleaf (Lamman Rucker). Simone was originally cast as a recurring cast member, but was promoted to a series regular as of the second season. Simone later made her film debut in a supporting role opposite Jennifer Hudson in the 2018 drama film Monster, which premiered at the 2018 Sundance Film Festival. The following year, she appeared in two drama films that premiered at 2019 Sundance Film Festival: Share and played a leading role in Selah and the Spades. Both films has received positive reviews from critics. In 2020, Simone played one of leads in writer-director Zoe Lister-Jones' horror film The Craft: Legacy, a sequel to the 1996 film The Craft.

In 2021, Simone starred in the first season of Starz crime drama series, Power Book III: Raising Kanan. In 2022, she was cast opposite Tobias Menzies Apple TV+ limited series, Manhunt. She starred in the period drama film The Walk, and set to appear in the science fiction thriller 57 Seconds.

Filmography

Film

Television

References

External links 
 

Living people
1998 births
American television actresses
21st-century American actresses
African-American actresses
American film actresses
Actresses from New York City
American people of Ghanaian descent
21st-century African-American women
21st-century African-American people